Glory is a 1989 American historical war drama film directed by Edward Zwick about the 54th Massachusetts Infantry Regiment, one of the Union Army's earliest African-American regiments in the American Civil War. It stars Matthew Broderick as Colonel Robert Gould Shaw, the regiment's commanding officer, and Denzel Washington, Cary Elwes, and Morgan Freeman as fictional members of the 54th. The screenplay by Kevin Jarre was based on the books Lay This Laurel (1973) by Lincoln Kirstein and One Gallant Rush (1965) by Peter Burchard and the personal letters of Shaw. The film depicts the soldiers of the 54th from the formation of their regiment to their heroic actions at the Second Battle of Fort Wagner.

Glory was co-produced by TriStar Pictures and Freddie Fields Productions, and distributed by Tri-Star Pictures in the United States. It premiered in limited release in the United States on December 14, 1989, and in wide release on February 16, 1990, grossing $27 million worldwide on an $18 million budget. The film was nominated for five Academy Awards and won three, including Best Supporting Actor for Washington. It also won awards from the British Academy of Film and Television Arts, the Golden Globe Awards, the Kansas City Film Critics Circle, the Political Film Society, and the NAACP Image Awards.

Plot
After being wounded at Antietam, Captain Robert Gould Shaw is sent home to Boston on medical leave. His well-connected father obtains for him a promotion to colonel of the 54th Massachusetts Infantry Regiment, one of the first all-black regiments in the Union Army. Shaw appoints his friend and fellow soldier Cabot Forbes as his second-in-command. Their first volunteer is Thomas Searles, a bookish, free African-American who works as the Shaw family's secretary. Other recruits include John Rawlins, Jupiter Sharts, Silas Trip, and a mute teenage drummer boy whom Rawlins refers to as "Honey".

The men learn that in response to the Emancipation Proclamation, the Confederacy has issued an order that captured black men are to be returned to slavery. Black soldiers found wearing uniforms will be executed as well as their white officers. Shaw offers honorable discharges to any man who does not want to fight, but no one takes his offer. The men undergo rigorous training from Sergeant-Major Mulcahy, who is particularly hard on Searles. Despite Mulcahy's treatment of his friend and the abuse he inflicts on the other recruits, Shaw reluctantly accepts that tough discipline is needed to prepare them for the coming challenges the regiment must face.

Trip deserts and is caught, and Shaw orders him flogged in front of the regiment. He then learns that Trip left to find proper shoes because his men are being denied these supplies. Shaw confronts the base's racist quartermaster on their behalf and gets the supplies. He also supports his men in a pay dispute; the federal government decrees that black soldiers will only be paid $10, not the $13 per month all white soldiers receive. When the men, led by Trip, begin tearing up their pay vouchers in protest of this unequal treatment, Shaw tears up his own voucher and declares that none of the white officers will accept pay. In recognition of the leadership he has displayed, Rawlins is promoted to the rank of sergeant major.

Once the 54th completes its training, the unit is transferred to serve under the command of Brigadier General Charles Harker. On their first mission, the 54th is ordered by Colonel James Montgomery to sack and burn Darien, Georgia with Montgomery's own poorly disciplined black soldiers. Shaw initially refuses to obey an unlawful order but reluctantly agrees under threat of facing a court-martial and being relieved of his command. He continues to lobby his superiors to allow his regiment to fight after weeks of having nothing to do but backbreaking manual labor.

Shaw finally gets the 54th a combat assignment after he blackmails Harker and Montgomery by threatening to inform the War Department of their involvement in illegal profiteering. In its first battle at James Island, South Carolina, the 54th successfully repels a Confederate attack that had routed other units. During the battle, Searles is wounded but saves Trip from being stabbed in the back. Shaw offers Trip the honor of bearing the regimental flag in battle. He declines, unsure if winning the war would result in a better life for ex-slaves like himself.

General George Strong informs Shaw along with his fellow commanders of a major campaign to secure a foothold at Charleston Harbor. This involves assaulting Morris Island and capturing Fort Wagner, whose only landward approach is a strip of open beach; a charge is certain to result in heavy casualties. Shaw volunteers the 54th to lead the attack. The night before the battle, the black soldiers conduct a religious service. Several make emotional speeches, including Trip, who finally embraces his fellow soldiers. On its way to the battlefield, the 54th is cheered by the same Union troops who had scorned them earlier.

The 54th leads the charge on the fort at dusk, suffering serious losses. As night falls, the regiment is pinned down against the fort's walls. Attempting to encourage his men forward, Shaw is struck by several bullets and killed. Trip, despite his previous assertion that he would not do it, lifts the flag and tries to rally the men before being shot dead. Forbes and Rawlins take charge, and the soldiers break through the fort's outer defenses. Seemingly on the brink of victory, Forbes, Rawlins, Searles, Sharts, and the two color sergeants realize that the enemy has cannons pointed right at them. The morning after the battle, the beach is littered with the bodies of black and white Union soldiers; the Confederate flag is raised over the fort. The dead Union soldiers are buried in a mass communal grave, with Shaw and Trip's bodies next to each other.

A textual epilogue reveals that the regiment lost over half its number during the assault and that Fort Wagner never fell to the Union Army. However, the courage demonstrated by the 54th spurred Congress to authorize the raising of black soldiers throughout the Union. Over 180,000 volunteered and President Abraham Lincoln credited them with helping to turn the tide of the war.

Cast 

 Matthew Broderick as Colonel Robert Gould Shaw
 Denzel Washington as Private Silas Trip
 Cary Elwes as Major Cabot Forbes
 Morgan Freeman as Sergeant Major John Rawlins
 Andre Braugher as Corporal Thomas Searles
 Jihmi Kennedy as Private Jupiter Sharts
 Cliff DeYoung as Colonel James Montgomery
 Alan North as Governor John Albion Andrew
 John Finn as Sergeant Major Mulcahy
 Mark Margolis as 10th Connecticut Soldier
 RonReaco Lee as Mute Drummer Boy
 Donovan Leitch as Captain Charles Fessenden Morse
 Bob Gunton as General Charles Garrison Harker
 Jay O. Sanders as General George Crockett Strong
 Raymond St. Jacques as Frederick Douglass
 Richard Riehle as Quartermaster
 JD Cullum as Henry Sturgis Russell
 Christian Baskous as Edward L. Pierce
 Peter Michael Goetz as Francis Shaw
 Jane Alexander as Sarah Blake Sturgis Shaw (uncredited)

Production

The title of the film recalls the "glory" for which the July 28, 1863, edition of the weekly Columbus Enquirer reported that First-Sergeant Robert John Simmons, mortally wounded at Battery Wagner, came to fight (Simmons himself wrote, in an account of the Battle of Grimball's Landing that was published in the New York Tribune on December 23, 1863: "God has protected me through this, my first fiery, leaden trial, and I do give Him the glory"). Kevin Jarre's inspiration for writing the film came from viewing the monument to Colonel Shaw and the 54th Massachusetts Volunteer Infantry in Boston Common. The 54th was the first formal unit of the Union Army to be made up entirely of African-American enlisted men; all of the officers were white men. His screenplay was based on two books, Lincoln Kirstein's Lay This Laurel (1973) and Peter Burchard's One Gallant Rush (1965), and the personal letters of Robert Gould Shaw.

Exterior filming took place primarily in Massachusetts and Georgia. Opening passages, meant to portray the Battle of Antietam, show volunteer military reenactors filmed at a major engagement at the Gettysburg battlefield. Zwick did not want to turn Glory "into a black story with a more commercially convenient white hero". Actor Morgan Freeman noted: "We didn't want this film to fall under that shadow. This is a picture about the 54th Regiment, not Colonel Shaw, but at the same time the two are inseparable". Zwick hired the writer Shelby Foote as a technical adviser, who later became widely known for his contributions to Ken Burns' PBS nine-episode documentary, The Civil War (1990).

Glory was the first major motion picture to tell the story of black U.S. soldiers fighting for their freedom from slavery during the Civil War. The 1965 James Stewart film Shenandoah also depicted black soldiers fighting for the Union, but the script suggested the Union army at that time was integrated.

On February 16, 1989, the body of a middle-aged man was discovered on the film's set in Savannah, about a day after his death. Described as having a Middle Eastern appearance, with no apparent signs of suffering a violent death, he was never positively identified.

Soundtrack

Glory's original motion picture soundtrack was released by Virgin Records on January 11, 1990. The score for the film was composed and orchestrated by James Horner in association with the Boys Choir of Harlem. Jim Henrikson edited the film's music, while Shawn Murphy mixed the score.

Marketing

Monograph
A nonfiction study of the regiment first appeared in 1965 and was republished in paperback in January 1990 by St. Martin's Press under the title One Gallant Rush: Robert Gould Shaw and His Brave Black Regiment. The book, by Peter Burchard, expands on how the 54th Massachusetts developed as battle-ready soldiers. Summarizing the historical events, the book provides events surrounding the aftermath of the first Black Union regiment and how it influenced the outcome of the war.

Release

Critical response
On Rotten Tomatoes, the film holds an approval rating of 94%, based on 52 reviews, with an average rating of 7.9/10. The site's consensus states: "Bolstered by exceptional cinematography, powerful storytelling, and an Oscar-winning performance by Denzel Washington, Glory remains one of the finest Civil War movies ever made."

Film critic Vincent Canby's review in The New York Times stated, "[Broderick] gives his most mature and controlled performance to date ... [Washington is] an actor clearly on his way to a major screen career ... The movie unfolds in a succession of often brilliantly realized vignettes tracing the 54th's organization, training and first experiences below the Mason-Dixon line. The characters' idiosyncrasies emerge". Roger Ebert from the Chicago Sun-Times gave the film three-and-a-half stars out of four, calling it "a strong and valuable film no matter whose eyes it is seen through". He believed the production design credited to Norman Garwood and the cinematography of Freddie Francis paid "enormous attention to period detail".

Peter Travers of Rolling Stone was not impressed at all with the overall acting, calling Broderick "catastrophically miscast as Shaw". Alternatively, Richard Schickel of Time described the picture by saying, "the movie's often awesome imagery and a bravely soaring choral score by James Horner that transfigure the reality, granting it the status of necessary myth". Desson Howe of The Washington Post, pointed out some flaws that included mentioning Broderick as "an amiable non-presence, creating unintentionally the notion that the 54th earned their stripes despite wimpy leadership".

James Berardinelli writing for ReelViews, called the film "without question, one of the best movies ever made about the American Civil War", noting that it "has important things to say, yet it does so without becoming pedantic". Rating the film four stars, critic Leonard Maltin wrote that it was "grand, moving, breathtakingly filmed (by veteran cinematographer Freddie Francis) and faultlessly performed", calling it "one of the finest historical dramas ever made".

Gene Siskel of the Chicago Tribune gave the film a thumbs up review, saying, "like Driving Miss Daisy, this is another admirable film that turns out to be surprisingly entertaining". He thought the film took on "some true social significance" and felt the actors portrayed the characters as "more than simply black men". He explained: "They're so different, that they become not merely standard Hollywood blacks, but true individuals".

American Civil War historian James M. McPherson stated the film "accomplished a remarkable feat in sensitizing a lot of today's black students to the role that their ancestors played in the Civil War in winning their own freedom".

Accolades
The film was nominated and won several awards in 1989–90. A complete list of awards the film won or was nominated for are listed below.

American Film Institute Lists
 AFI's 100 Years...100 Movies – Nominated
 AFI's 100 Years...100 Thrills – Nominated
 AFI's 100 Years...100 Heroes and Villains:
 Private Silas Trip – Nominated Hero
 AFI's 100 Years of Film Scores – Nominated
 AFI's 100 Years...100 Cheers – #31
 AFI's 100 Years...100 Movies (10th Anniversary Edition) – Nominated

Box office

The film premiered in cinemas on December 14, 1989, in limited release within the US. During its limited opening weekend, the film grossed $63,661 in business showing at three locations. Its official wide release began in theaters on February 16, 1990. Opening in a distant eighth place, the film earned $2,683,350 showing at 801 cinemas. The film Driving Miss Daisy soundly beat its competition during that weekend opening in first place with $9,834,744. The film's revenue dropped by 37% in its second week of release, earning $1,682,720. For that particular weekend, the film remained in 8th place screening in 809 theaters not challenging a top five position. The film Driving Miss Daisy, remained in first place grossing $6,107,836 in box office revenue. Glory went on to top out domestically at $26,828,365 in total ticket sales through a 17-week theatrical run. For 1989 as a whole, the film would cumulatively rank at a box office performance position of 45.

Home media
Following its release in theaters, the film was released on VHS video format on June 22, 1990. The Region 1 DVD widescreen edition of the film was released  in the United States on January 20, 1998. Special DVD features include: interactive menus, scene selections, 1.85:1 anamorphic widescreen, along with subtitles in English, Italian, Spanish and French. A Special Edition DVD of the Film was released on January 30, 2001.

A special repackaged version of Glory was also officially released on DVD on January 2, 2007. It includes two discs featuring: widescreen and full screen versions of the film; Picture-in-Picture video commentary by director Ed Zwick and actors Morgan Freeman and Matthew Broderick; a director's audio commentary; and a documentary entitled, The True Story of Glory Continues narrated by Morgan Freeman. Also included are: an exclusive featurette entitled, Voices of Glory, an original featurette, deleted scenes, production notes, theatrical trailers, talent files, and scene selections.

The Blu-ray disc version of the film was released on June 2, 2009. Special features include: a virtual civil war battlefield, interactive map, The Voice Of Glory feature, The True Story Continues documentary, the making of Glory, director's commentary, and deleted scenes. The film is displayed in widescreen 1.85:1 color format in 1080p screen resolution. The audio is enhanced with Dolby TrueHD sound and is available with subtitles in English, Spanish, French, and Portuguese. A UMD version of the film for the Sony PlayStation Portable was also released on July 1, 2008. It features dubbed, subtitled, and color widescreen format viewing options.

See also

 Denzel Washington filmography
 List of films featuring slavery
 List of films and television shows about the American Civil War
 1989 in film

References

External links

 
 
 
 
 
 Glory at the Movie Review Query Engine
 
 

1989 films
1989 drama films
1980s American films
1980s English-language films
1980s historical drama films
1980s war drama films
African-American drama films
African-American war films
African Americans in the American Civil War
American Civil War films
American films based on actual events
American historical drama films
American war drama films
Cultural depictions of Frederick Douglass
Drama films based on actual events
Films about American slavery
Films about race and ethnicity
Films about the United States Army
Films based on multiple works
Films based on non-fiction books
Films directed by Edward Zwick
Films featuring a Best Supporting Actor Academy Award-winning performance
Films featuring a Best Supporting Actor Golden Globe winning performance
Films scored by James Horner
Films set in the 1860s
Films set in Georgia (U.S. state)
Films set in Massachusetts
Films set in South Carolina
Films shot in Savannah, Georgia
Films that won the Best Sound Mixing Academy Award
Films whose cinematographer won the Best Cinematography Academy Award
Massachusetts in the American Civil War
TriStar Pictures films
War films based on actual events